William George Cove (21 May 1888 – 15 March 1963) was a British politician. He served as a Labour Party Member of Parliament (MP) from 1923 to 1959.

Cove was born in Halifax Terrace, Middle Rhondda, to Edwin and Elizabeth Cove. His father, a miner, was born in Berkeley in Gloucestershire and was among the thousands from the west of England who migrated to the Rhondda Valleys at the end of the nineteenth century to seek work in the rapidly expanding coal industry. His mother was a native of Aberdare. Cove trained as a teacher and in 1911 was employed as a teacher by Rhondda Urban Council.

Cove was first elected to Parliament in the 1923 general election for the Northamptonshire constituency of Wellingborough, where he succeeded the National Liberal MP Geoffrey Shakespeare. In the 1929 general election, Cove left Wellingborough to become MP for the Welsh constituency of Aberavon, where the Labour Leader Ramsay MacDonald had stood down to stand for the County Durham seat of Seaham. Cove remained MP for Aberavon until he retired at the 1959 general election after 36 years in the Commons, he was succeeded at Aberavon by John Morris. He died in 1963 aged 74 in Chipping Norton, Oxfordshire.

Cove has been neglected by historians and he does not feature in the Dictionary of Welsh Biography.

References

Sources

Books and Journals

Other sources

British Parliamentary Election Results 1918-1949, compiled and edited by F.W.S. Craig (The Macmillan Press 1979)

External links 
 

1888 births
1963 deaths
Welsh Labour Party MPs
Members of the Parliament of the United Kingdom for English constituencies
Miners' Federation of Great Britain-sponsored MPs
Presidents of the National Union of Teachers
UK MPs 1923–1924
UK MPs 1924–1929
UK MPs 1929–1931
UK MPs 1931–1935
UK MPs 1935–1945
UK MPs 1945–1950
UK MPs 1950–1951
UK MPs 1951–1955
UK MPs 1955–1959
Welsh socialists
Parliamentary Peace Aims Group